Eugene McGuinness is the eponymous debut studio album by British singer-songwriter Eugene McGuinness.  It was released on 12 October 2008 in the United Kingdom, and on 23 June 2009 in North America, through Domino Recording Company.

Track listing 
"Rings Around Rosa" – 2:36
"Fonz" – 2:20
"Wendy Wonders" – 3:58
"Moscow State Circus" – 4:36
"Those Old Black and White Movies Were True" – 2:49
"Nightshift" – 1:38
"Atlas" – 2:55
"Knock Down Ginger" – 3:10
"Crown the Clown" – 2:58
"Not So Academic" – 3:38
"Disneyfied" – 2:31
"God In Space" – 3:52

References

2008 debut albums
Domino Recording Company albums
Albums produced by Ant Whiting